During the 2000–01 Belgian football season, R.S.C. Anderlecht competed in the Belgian First Division.

Season summary
Anderlecht won the Belgian title.

First-team squad

Reserve squad

League table

R.S.C. Anderlecht seasons
Anderlecht
Belgian football championship-winning seasons